Lieutenant-General Sir Edward Altham Altham,  (13 April 1856 – 27 September 1943) was a British Army officer who served in the Second Boer War and as a senior intelligence officer during World War I. He was Quartermaster-General in India 1917–1919.

Biography
Altham was born in Wilton, Somerset in 1856, the second son of Major W. S. Altham, late 83rd Foot, of Timbercombe, Bridgwater, and Henrietta Moulton-Barrett of Hope End, Herefordshire.

He entered the Army in 1876, and was commissioned into The Royal Scots, the oldest infantry regiment in the army, and served in the Bechuanaland Expedition 1884–85. He transferred to staff duty and was at the Intelligence Division, War Office, from 1897 to 1899. After the outbreak of the Second Boer War in October that year, he was sent to South Africa, where he served as Assistant Adjutant-General for Intelligence. For his service he was twice mentioned in despatches, received the Queen's Medal with four clasps, and was promoted to lieutenant-colonel. After his return to the United Kingdom in 1900, he passed Staff College, and from 1900 to 1904 was back at the Intelligence Division, where he served as deputy assistant adjutant-general. He was appointed a Companion of the Order of St Michael and St George (CMG) in the November 1901 Birthday Honours list. He served on the General Staff in South Africa from 1906 to 1908.

Atham served throughout the First world war. He was appointed in charge of Administration, Southern Command, in 1914; then served, commanding the Lines of Communication on Mudros, with conspicuous success, Dardanelles campaign 1915, and in the Egyptian Expeditionary Force 1916. He gave evidence to the Dardanelles Commission of Enquiry. He was appointed Quartermaster-general in India in 1917, serving as such until 1919. For his service in the war, he was mentioned in despatches seven times, and promoted to lieutenant-general. He was appointed a Knight Commander of the Order of the Bath (KCB) in 1916, a Knight Commander of the Order of the Indian Empire (KCIE) in 1919, and received the Grand Cross of the Order of the White Eagle from Serbia, and the Grand Cross of the Order of the Sacred Treasure from Japan.

He was Colonel of the Royal Scots from 1918 until 1934.

After his retirement he lived in Winchester, where he was a member of the Winchester Diocesan Board of Finance.

Altham died on 27 September 1943.

Family
Altham married in 1880 Georgina Emily Nicol, daughter of William Macpherson Nicol of Inverness. They had two sons and one daughter:
Captain Edward Altham, CB (1882–1950), of the Royal Navy
Major Harry Surtees Altham, CBE, DSO, MC (1888–1965)
Dorothy Mary Altham (1883-1969)

References

|-

 

1856 births
1943 deaths
British Army lieutenant generals
British Army generals of World War I
Knights Commander of the Order of the Bath
Companions of the Order of St Michael and St George
Knights Commander of the Order of the Indian Empire
Royal Scots officers
British people in colonial India
Military personnel from Somerset